John Thomas Keady (August 18, 1882 – February 12, 1964) was an American football, basketball, and baseball player and coach.  He served as the head football coach at Lehigh University from 1912 to 1920, at the University of Vermont from 1921 to 1924, at Marine Corps Base Quantico from 1925 to 1930, and at Western Reserve University from 1931 to 1933, compiling a career college football record of 87–48–6.  Keady was also the head basketball coach and the head baseball coach at Dartmouth College, Lehigh, Vermont, and Quantico.

Early life and playing career
Keady was born on August 18, 1882 in Wakefield, Massachusetts.  He attended Dartmouth College, where he lettered in football and baseball.

Coaching career
Keady was the 13th head football coach at Lehigh University) in Bethlehem, Pennsylvania, serving for nine seasons, from 1912 to 1920, and compiling a record at Lehigh was 56–23–3. Keady was the head football coach at Western Reserve University from 1931 to 1933, compiling a record of 14–9–2 in three seasons.

Death
Keady died at the age of 82 on February 12, 1964, in Concord, New Hampshire.

Head coaching record

Football

Basketball

References

External links
 

1882 births
1964 deaths
Basketball coaches from Massachusetts
Case Western Spartans football coaches
Dartmouth Big Green baseball coaches
Dartmouth Big Green baseball players
Dartmouth Big Green football coaches
Dartmouth Big Green football players
Dartmouth Big Green men's basketball coaches
Fordham Rams baseball coaches
Lehigh Mountain Hawks baseball coaches
Lehigh Mountain Hawks football coaches
Lehigh Mountain Hawks men's basketball coaches
Lynn Shoemakers players
People from Wakefield, Massachusetts
Quantico Marines Devil Dogs football coaches
Sportspeople from Middlesex County, Massachusetts
Vermont Catamounts baseball coaches
Vermont Catamounts football coaches
Vermont Catamounts men's basketball coaches
Worcester Busters players